David James Potts (born 5 May 1993) is an English television personality. Since 2016, he has appeared as head rep on the ITV2 reality series Ibiza Weekender. He has also appeared on the E4 dating series Celebs Go Dating and has finished as runner-up on Celebs on the Farm, Celebrity Karaoke Club and Celebrity Ghost Trip.

Life and career
Potts was born on 5 May 1993 in Bolton, Manchester. In 2016, Potts joined the cast of the ITV2 reality television series Ibiza Weekender. He joined during the show's fifth series as assistant head rep, alongside Ellie Young. He later returned and became head rep from the sixth series onwards. In February 2019, Potts appeared in a celebrity episode of Dinner Date, where he went on dates with three different men. The following week he began appearing on the sixth series of the E4 dating series Celebs Go Dating.

In September 2019, Potts was a contestant on the second series of the 5Star farming reality series, Celebs on the Farm in which he finished as the runner-up. In July 2020, Potts competed in the first series of Celebrity Karaoke Club on ITV2. He finished as the runner-up, losing out to Scarlett Moffatt. In October 2021, Potts was a contestant on Celebrity Ghost Trip, the Halloween spin-off of Celebrity Coach Trip,  alongside his Ibiza Weekender co-star, Callum Izzard. They reached the final day and finished in second place. In 2022, he is set to appear as a contestant on the ITV2 reality series Apocalypse Wow.

Potts has also made several guest appearances on shows such as CelebAbility, Hey Tracey!, Home Alone with Joel Dommett and also hosts the spin-off episode of The Cabins on ITV2.

Filmography

References

External links
 

1993 births
English gay men
Living people
People from Bolton
Participants in British reality television series
21st-century English LGBT people